Alucita xanthodes is a species of moth of the family Alucitidae. It is found in Queensland, Australia.

The wingspan is about 12 mm. Each wing is divided into six separate fronds. Every frond has a pattern of six alternate yellow and white patches, with a dark spot on each side of the second, fourth and sixth yellow marks.

External links
Australian Faunal Directory
Australian Insects
Image at CSIRO Entomology

Moths of Queensland
Alucitidae
Moths described in 1890
Taxa named by Edward Meyrick